Vertientes Municipal Museum is a museum located in Vertientes, Cuba. It was established on 16 December 1982.

The museum holds collections on history and weaponry.

See also 
 List of museums in Cuba

References 

Museums in Cuba
Buildings and structures in Camagüey Province
Museums established in 1982
1982 establishments in Cuba
20th-century architecture in Cuba